"Phoenix" is a song by American hip hop recording artist ASAP Rocky, from his debut album Long.Live.ASAP. It was released on January 15, 2013. The song was produced by Danger Mouse.

Music video
The music video was released on November 12, 2013. It was directed by Francesco Carrozzini and written by Carrozzini and Asia Argento. The video stars Michael K. Williams, known for his roles in The Wire and Boardwalk Empire, as well as model Joan Smalls.

Track listing

Charts

References

ASAP Rocky songs
Song recordings produced by Danger Mouse (musician)
2013 songs
Songs written by ASAP Rocky